The 6th Annual Premios Juventud (Youth Awards) were broadcast by Univision on July 16, 2009.

Winners and nominees

Special awards

Most Searched (Internet)
RBD

Performers
 Intro — "Premios Juventud 2009"
 Paulina Rubio — "Causa Y Efecto"
 Alacranes Musical — "Fue Su Amor"
 Alexis & Fido — "Ojos Que No Ven"
 Alicia Villarreal — "Caso Perdido"
 Anahí — "Mi Delirio"
 La Arrolladora Banda El Limón —
 Cristian Castro - "Por La Espalda"
 Da' Zoo — "Chitu" 
 German Montero — "Comprendeme"
 Luis Fonsi — "Llueve Por Dentro"
 Los Super Reyes — "Eres"
 Makano — "Te Amo"
 Marc Anthony feat La Quinta Estación — "Recuérdame"
 Pee Wee — "Cumbaya"
 Ricardo Arjona — "Como Duele"
 Shaila Dúrcal —
 Tito "El Bambino" — "El Amor "
 Wisin & Yandel — "Abusadora"

Presenters

 Anahí
 Alacranes Musical
 Aleks Syntek
 Alessandra Rosaldo
 Alexander Acha
 Alexis & Fido
 Alicia Villarreal
 Arcángel
 Ariel López Padilla - Actor
 Aventura
 La Arrolladora Banda El Limón
 Beto Cuevas
 Carlos Calderón - TV personality
 Chenoa
 Christopher Vonn Ucherman
 Cristian Castro
 Da Zoo
 Eiza González
 Eugenio Dervez - Actor
 Fanny Lú
 Germán Montero
 Greidys Gil - Model
 Guy Ecker - Actor
 Jesse & Joy
 Jorge Celedon & Jimmy Zambrano
 Juan Soler - Actor
 Kany García
 Karla Martínez - TV personality
 Karyme Lozano - Actress
 Kate del Castillo - Actress
 La Quinta Estación
 Lili Estefan - TV personality
 Los Súper Reyes
 Luis Fonsi
 Makano
 Maki - Actress
 Marc Anthony
 Miguelito
 Olga Tañón
 Paulina Rubio
 Paty Cantú
 Pee Wee
 Playa Limbo
 Rafael Mercadante - Actor
 Ricardo Arjona
 Shaila Dúrcal
 Tito "El Bambino"
 Wisin & Yandel
 Yahir

References

Premios Juventud
Premios Juventud
Premios Juventud
Premios Juventud
Premios Juventud
Premios Juventud
Premios Juventud
2000s in Miami